The 2014 FC Irtysh Pavlodar season was the 23rd successive season that the club playing in the Kazakhstan Premier League, the highest tier of association football in Kazakhstan. Irtysh finished the season in 10th position and reached the Quarter-finals of the Kazakhstan Cup, where they lost to Shakhter Karagandy.

Season Events
On 2 May Tarmo Rüütli was fired by the club. On 27 October, Dmitri Cheryshev was appointed as the club's manager on a two-year contract.

Squad
As of 18 October 2014

Transfers

Winter

In:

Out:

Summer

In:

Out:

Competitions

Kazakhstan Premier League

First round

Results summary

Results by round

Results

League table

Relegation Round

Results summary

Results by round

Results

Table

Kazakhstan Cup

Squad statistics

Appearances and goals

|-
|colspan="14"|Players away from Irtysh on loan:

|-
|colspan="14"|Players who appeared for Irtysh that left during the season:

|}

Goal scorers

Disciplinary record

References

External links
 Official Site

Irtysh
FC Irtysh Pavlodar seasons